Rafael Rivera was a Mexican scout and the first non-Native American to set foot in the Las Vegas Valley. Trader Antonio Armijo led a 60-man party along the Spanish Trail to Los Angeles, California in 1829. While his caravan group was camped Christmas Day about 100 miles northeast of present-day Las Vegas, a scouting party rode west in search for water. The inexperienced Rivera left the main party and ventured into unexplored area. Within two weeks, he discovered the Las Vegas Springs. The abundant artesian spring water discovered at Las Vegas shortened the Spanish Trail to Los Angeles. About 14 years later after Rivera's discovery, John C. Frémont led an expedition west and camped at Las Vegas Springs on May 13, 1844.

The Rafael Rivera Park, Community Center and Rafael Rivera, a street, are named after him.  He is also commemorated by Nevada Historical Marker 214.

References

19th-century Mexican people
History of Las Vegas